Stanley Market is a street market in Stanley on Hong Kong Island, Hong Kong. The street is a typical example of a traditional old open-air market in Hong Kong and has since become a major tourist attraction, well known for its bargains. Many of the stalls or shops in Stanley Market sell Hong Kong souvenirs as well as clothing - particularly silk garments and traditional Chinese dress - toys, ornaments, luggage, souvenirs, paintings, and Chinese arts and crafts. The market grew out of Chek Chu Tsuen, a nearby village.

There are several small Chinese restaurants in the marketplace and a small old dai pai dong or open food stall. There are also a variety of restaurants along the seafront.

The nearby Stanley Main Street offers many larger restaurants, both Western and Chinese.

References

External links

 Stanley Market (Hong Kong Tourism Board)

Street markets in Hong Kong
Stanley, Hong Kong